Vera Korsakova (born 21 March 1941) is a Kyrgyzstani hurdler. She competed in the women's 80 metres hurdles at the 1968 Summer Olympics representing the Soviet Union.

References

1941 births
Living people
Athletes (track and field) at the 1968 Summer Olympics
Kyrgyzstani female hurdlers
Soviet female hurdlers
Olympic athletes of the Soviet Union
Place of birth missing (living people)